Arrowhead Recreation Area is located in and owned by the city of Claremont, New Hampshire, in Sullivan County. Activities offered include alpine skiing, snow tubing, and skating during winter months. The facility is managed by the non-profit Arrowhead Recreation Club.

History
The ski area originally opened in 1962 as King's Arrow. It operated irregularly for three decades, mostly as Arrowhead Skiway. Terrain for all abilities was available, served by two Poma surface lifts.

The ski area sat dormant for much of the 1990s, before reopening in 2004. The area currently offers platter-pull-serviced alpine skiing and tubing and has terrain lit for night operations. While the area once sported a 600-ft vertical drop, only 120-ft are currently lift-serviced.

References

External links
Arrowhead Recreation Area - Official site
Arrowhead Skiway - New England Lost Ski Areas Project

Ski areas and resorts in New Hampshire
Buildings and structures in Claremont, New Hampshire
Tourist attractions in Sullivan County, New Hampshire